Singu may refer to:

Singu, town in the Mandalay Division of central Myanmar
Singu Chuli (Fluted Peak), one of the trekking peaks in the Nepali Himalaya range
Singu Plateau, volcanic plateau located in central Burma
Singu Township, township of Pyinoolwin District, Mandalay Division, Myanmar

See also
Singu Min (1756–1782), the fourth king of the Konbaung dynasty of Myanmar